Clifton (Mayfield) railway station was opened on 3 May 1852 by the North Staffordshire Railway at Clifton on the southern fringes of Ashbourne, Derbyshire. Originally named Clifton, it was renamed Clifton (Mayfield) on 22 August 1893, and was known as Clifton for Mayfield in some timetables.

It was on a branch from Rocester to Ashbourne and in 1899 it was met by the Ashbourne Line built by the London and North Western Railway from Buxton.

Regular passenger services ceased on 1 November 1954 and freight ended in 1964

Route

References

See also
 Cromford and High Peak Railway

 
 
 

Disused railway stations in Derbyshire
Peak District
Railway stations in Great Britain opened in 1852
Railway stations in Great Britain closed in 1964
Former North Staffordshire Railway stations
1852 establishments in England